West Knighton  may refer to:
West Knighton, Dorset, a village in England
West Knighton, Leicestershire, a suburb of Leicester, England